Robbie Louw (born Robert Mathew Mark Louw on ) is a South African rugby union player that played first class rugby for the  in 2016. He made one appearance in the Currie Cup qualifiers and three appearances in the Currie Cup Premier Division. His regular position is centre.

Family
He is the son of Rob Louw, a rugby player that played rugby union and rugby league in the last 1970s and early 1980s, making 19 test appearances for the South Africa national team. He also has three sisters, Roxy, Mystique, and Shahnee.

References

External links
 Official site

South African rugby union players
Living people
1992 births
Rugby union players from Cape Town
Rugby union centres
Boland Cavaliers players